Franz Hofer (born  Franz Wygand Wuestenhoefer; 31 August 1882 – 5 May 1945) was a German film director. He directed more than eighty films from 1913 to 1933.

Selected filmography

References

External links 

1882 births
1945 deaths
Film directors from Saarland
People from Saarbrücken